Illinois Route 174 (IL 174) was a state highway in Illinois from 1924 to 1983. The route connected IL 88 (now IL 40) and IL 91 through the community of Alta.  IL 174 was established in 1924 as part of the later series of State Bond Issue (SBI) Routes. It was decommissioned in 1983.

Route description
IL 174 began in Peoria at the intersection of N. Knoxville Avenue, which carried IL 88, and W. Pioneer Parkway.  IL 174 headed west on W. Pioneer Parkway to the south of Mount Hawley Auxiliary Airport.  It turned north onto Allen Road and headed towards Alta.  Near an abandoned Rock Island Railroad line, the highway turned to the northwest and into Alta.  Northwest of the town, the highway straightened to the west.  It ended at a T intersection with IL 91.

Major intersections

References

1924 establishments in Illinois
1983 disestablishments
Transportation in Peoria County, Illinois
174